The following is a list of Shooto World champions at each weight class.  Note that the weight classes in Shooto are different from the Association of Boxing Commissions recognised weight classes.

Title Histories

Heavyweight Championship
Weight limit: 100 kg (220.5 lb)
NOTE:  Shooto weight classes are different than the United States Association of Boxing Commissions, which is used by most MMA promotions.

Light Heavyweight Championship
Weight limit: 85 kg (187.4 lb)
NOTE:  Shooto weight classes are different than the United States Association of Boxing Commissions, which is used by most MMA promotions.  This is closer to the ABC-recognised Middleweight class.

Middleweight Championship
Weight limit: 77 kg (169.8 lb)
NOTE:  Shooto weight classes are different than the United States Association of Boxing Commissions, which is used by most MMA promotions.  This is closer to the ABC-recognised Welterweight class.

Welterweight Championship
Weight limit: 70 kg (154.3 lb)
NOTE:  Shooto weight classes are different than the United States Association of Boxing Commissions, which is used by most MMA promotions.  This is closer to the ABC-recognised Lightweight class.

Lightweight Championship
Weight limit: 65 kg (143.3 lb)
NOTE:  Shooto weight classes are different than the United States Association of Boxing Commissions, which is used by most MMA promotions.  This is closer to the ABC-recognised Featherweight class.

Featherweight Championship
Weight limit: 60 kg (132.3 lb)
NOTE:  Shooto weight classes are different than the United States Association of Boxing Commissions, which is used by most MMA promotions.  This is closer to the ABC-recognised Bantamweight class.

Bantamweight Championship
Weight limit: 56 kg (123.4 lb)
NOTE:  Shooto weight classes are different than the United States Association of Boxing Commissions, which is used by most MMA promotions.  This is closer to the ABC-recognised Flyweight class.

Flyweight Championship
Weight limit: 52 kg (114.6 lb)
NOTE:  Shooto weight classes are different than the United States Association of Boxing Commissions, which is used by most MMA promotions.  This is closer to the ABC-recognised Strawweight class.

Women's Super Atomeweight Championship
Weight limit: 50 kg (110.2 lbs)

Women's Atomeweight Championship
Weight limit: 48 kg (105.8 lbs)

Records

Most wins in title bouts
The following includes all fighters with four or more championship and/or interim championship title wins.

Most consecutive title defenses
The following includes all Bellator champions who were able to consecutively defend their title three times or more. Fighters with the same number of title defenses are listed chronologically.

Multi-division champions
Fighters who have won championships in multiple weight classes. Tournament champions are not included.

By nationality

The following include championship title holders by nationality.

See also
List of Shooto Pacific Rim champions
 List of current mixed martial arts champions
 List of Bellator MMA champions
 List of Dream champions
 List of EliteXC champions
 List of Invicta FC champions
 List of ONE Championship champions
 List of Pancrase champions
 List of Pride champions
 List of PFL champions
 List of Strikeforce champions
 List of UFC champions
 List of WEC champions
 Mixed martial arts weight classes

References

External links 
Australia Shooto Commission official website
shootoresult.versus.jp
Shooto Japan official website(Japanese)
First Documented Introduction and Presence of Shooto in the Philippines
Bulgarian Shooto federation Official Site

Shooto
Mixed martial arts champions
Shooto Champions, List Of
de:Shooto
fr:Shooto
sr:Шуто